The New University of Brussels was a private university active in Brussels, Belgium between 1894 and 1919.

Its origins were in the Free University of Brussels, a liberal institution, which  became the subject of controversy in December 1892 when the anarchist geographer Élisée Reclus was prevented from teaching for political reasons. In the aftermath, a number of liberal and socialist members of faculty began to plan for an independent "new" university, eventually created in October 1894. It was libertarian in political outlook, and attracted a significant proportion of international students and faculty members. However, its degrees were not recognised by the Belgian government and it remained short of funds.

The New University was the only university in Belgium which continued teaching through the German occupation of Belgium during World War I. In 1919, however, it was decided to re-merge the institution with the Free University. Its last surviving remnant is the Institut des Hautes Etudes de Belgique which provides free public lectures and conferences.

Faculty members

 Emile Vandervelde
 Paul Janson
 Edmond Picard
 Enrico Ferri
 Achille Loria
 Paul Sollier
 Alexandra David-Néel
 Louis de Brouckère
 Augustin Hamon
 Élisée Reclus
 Henri La Fontaine
 Paul Otlet

Further reading
 

Free University of Brussels (1834–1969)
Educational institutions established in 1894
1894 establishments in Belgium
Educational institutions disestablished in 1919
1919 disestablishments in Belgium
Libertarianism in Belgium
Universities in Belgium